The future Rhodesian Prime Minister Ian Smith served in the Royal Air Force (RAF) during the Second World War, interrupting his studies at Rhodes University in South Africa to join up in 1941. Following a year's pilot instruction in Southern Rhodesia under the Empire Air Training Scheme, he was posted to No. 237 (Rhodesia) Squadron, then stationed in the Middle East, in late 1942. Smith received six weeks' operational training in the Levant, then entered active service as a pilot officer in Iran and Iraq. No. 237 Squadron, which had operated in the Western Desert from 1941 to early 1942, returned to that front in March 1943. Smith flew in the Western Desert until October that year, when a crash during a night takeoff resulted in serious injuries, including facial disfigurements and a broken jaw. Following reconstructive plastic surgery to his face, other operations and five months' convalescence, Smith rejoined No. 237 Squadron in Corsica in May 1944. While there, he attained his highest rank, flight lieutenant.

In late June 1944, during a strafing attack on a railway yard in the Po Valley in northern Italy, Smith was shot down by anti-aircraft fire. Parachuting from his aircraft, he landed without serious injury in the Ligurian Alps, in an area that was behind German lines, but largely under the control of anti-German Italian partisans. Smith spent three months working with the local resistance movement before trekking westwards, across the Maritime Alps, with three other Allied personnel, hoping to join up with the Allied forces that had just invaded southern France. After 23 days' hiking, he and his companions were recovered by American troops and repatriated.

Smith was briefly stationed in Britain before he was posted to No. 130 (Punjab) Squadron in western Germany in April 1945. He flew combat missions there until Germany surrendered in May. He remained with No. 130 Squadron for the rest of his service, and returned home at the end of 1945. After completing his studies at Rhodes, he was elected to the Legislative Assembly for his birthplace, Selukwe, in 1948. He became Prime Minister in 1964, during his country's dispute with Britain regarding the terms for independence; Smith was influenced as a politician by his wartime experiences, and Rhodesia's military record on behalf of Britain became central to his sense of betrayal by post-war British governments. This partly motivated his administration's Unilateral Declaration of Independence in 1965. His status as a Second World War RAF veteran helped him win support, both domestically and internationally.

Background
Ian Smith was born in 1919, the son of British settlers in Selukwe, Southern Rhodesia. He attended Chaplin School in Gwelo, where he was head prefect, recipient of the Victor Ludorum in athletics, captain of the school teams in cricket, rugby union and tennis, and successful academically. After graduating in 1937, he attended Rhodes University College in Grahamstown, South Africa, which was often attended by Rhodesian students, partly because Rhodesia then had no university of its own. Enrolling at the start of 1938, Smith read for a Bachelor of Commerce degree. He was about halfway through his course when the Second World War broke out in September 1939.

Enlisting and training in Rhodesia

Smith was fascinated by the idea of being a fighter pilot, and particularly excited by the prospect of flying a Spitfire. He wanted to leave Rhodes immediately to join the Southern Rhodesian Air Force, but did not because military recruiters in the colony had been told not to accept university students until after they graduated. As in the First World War, white Rhodesians in general were very keen to enlist; because it was feared that the absence of these men might adversely affect the strategically important mines, manpower controls were introduced to keep certain whites out of the military and in their civilian occupations. One of Southern Rhodesia's main contributions to the Allied war effort proved to be its participation, from 1940, in the Empire Air Training Scheme. The Southern Rhodesian Air Force was absorbed into the British Royal Air Force (RAF) in April 1940, becoming No. 237 (Rhodesia) Squadron RAF. Two more RAF squadrons, No. 44 and No. 266, were subsequently also designated "Rhodesian" formations.

Remaining at Rhodes during the 1940 academic year, Smith secretly made plans to leave for military service in spite of his instructions to finish studying. In June 1940, during the mid-year break from studies, he quietly travelled to the Southern Rhodesian capital, Salisbury, to tell the colony's director of manpower, William Addison, that he wanted to join the air force; to avoid being barred from enlistment, Smith did not mention his university attendance, and gave his Selukwe address. During his Christmas vacation at the end of 1940, Smith went to Salisbury again, and was successful in a second interview with an air force official and a physical examination. Early in 1941, having received his pilot course call-up papers, Smith underwent a final interview, during which it emerged that he was a university student; the interviewer briefly demurred, but accepted Smith when he insisted that he wanted to sign up.

In September 1941 Smith formally enlisted in the Royal Air Force and received service number 80463. He began his instruction with Initial Training Wing in Bulawayo, and after six weeks transferred to Elementary Flying Training School at Guinea Fowl, just outside Gwelo. The majority of the men he trained alongside were Australians, and many others were British. Smith was glad to find himself in a course that would ultimately lead to flying fighters as opposed to bombers, since at Guinea Fowl he learned to pilot Tiger Moths, then Harvards. He was also pleased to have been posted only a half-hour car journey from Selukwe. Late in the course he was picked out to undergo instruction as an officer cadet, which meant he was transferred to Thornhill, another Gwelo airbase. He passed out in September 1942 with the rank of pilot officer; his training in Southern Rhodesia had taken a year in all.

Service

Middle East and North Africa

Smith hoped to be posted to Britain at the end of his training, and was initially told that this was going to happen, but he was instead sent to the Middle East. He was despatched to Idku, a small RAF base near Cairo, in late 1942, from where he was posted to an operational training unit based at Baalbek in Lebanon. He spent six weeks there, flying over much of the Levant in a Hawker Hurricane fighter, before being posted to No. 237 (Rhodesia) Squadron to begin active service, again piloting Hurricanes. The squadron was stationed near the Iranian capital of Tehran when Smith joined it, but it almost immediately transferred to Kirkuk in Iraq, to help guard the oil wells and pipelines there. In March 1943, it was again committed to the Western Desert campaign in North Africa, having previously served there during 1941–1942, and Smith served on this front as a Hurricane pilot. He was promoted to flying officer on 25 March 1943.

On 4 October 1943, Smith took off from Idku at dawn in a Hurricane Mk IIC to escort a shipping convoy. Light was extremely poor, and Smith's throttle malfunctioned; he failed to take off quickly enough to clear a blast wall at the end of the runway. The undercarriage of the aircraft scraped against some sandbags on the wall, causing Smith to lose control of the plane and crash. Smith suffered serious facial injuries, and broke his jaw, a leg and a shoulder. Doctors thought at first that his back had also been broken, but it had only been buckled.

A team of doctors and surgeons at the Fifteenth Scottish Hospital in Cairo worked extensively on Smith, putting his jaw back together with a complicated assembly of bandage, plaster, nuts, bolts and wire, and rebuilt his face through skin grafts and other reconstructive surgery. In March 1944, after about five months' convalescence, he was passed fit for flying. He turned down the offer of a posting home to Southern Rhodesia as an instructor and, after a refresher course in Egypt, travelled to Corsica to rejoin No. 237 Squadron, which was by now flying Spitfire Mk IXs.

Italy

Smith joined No. 237 Squadron in Corsica on 10 May 1944, and resumed operational flying two days later. He was promoted in the field to flight lieutenant.  The unit was attached to an American bomber group, and assigned to cover it during attacks on northern Italian cities. The fighters also embarked on strafing raids in the Po Valley against railway traffic and heavy vehicles. Smith flew 10 sorties and on the last of these, on 22 June, led a strafing raid against a large railway yard when his aircraft was hit by flak on a second pass. He warned other pilots not to attempt a second pass on the railway yard, and turned towards the coast, hoping to ditch in the sea. Smith's wingman, Alan Douglas, told him by radio that black smoke was coming from the aircraft, then that the engine was ablaze. Smith bailed out. He had never parachuted before. He turned his Spitfire upside down, thrust the stick forward, released the cockpit's canopy, fell out of the plane and landed without serious injuries on the side of a mountain.

According to his own account, he initially hid in a large bush, but decided this was too obvious, and so moved to a smaller one. A German patrol arrived, examined the original bush, and attacked it with bursts of automatic gunfire before leaving. "Somebody was keeping an eye on me when I thought I'd better get out of that bush ..." he later told Phillippa Berlyn. The area in which he had landed was predominantly anti-German, and largely under the control of pro-Allied Italian partisans; one of these saw Smith's descent and retrieved his parachute to stop the Germans from finding it. Smith hid for a while longer before emerging to greet a boy of about 12. The boy, Leo, knew no English; using sign language, he told Smith to sit and wait, and shortly returned with his elder brother, Lorenzo. Lorenzo proposed that Smith come to their home to eat, and Smith accepted. The boys' parents, peasant farmers named Zunino, took him in, but decided it was too risky to keep him at the house so soon after the crash, and hid him in a cave on the mountain. The next day, the Germans came to the Zuninos' house, looking for Smith. After about a week, the danger had subsided, and the Zuninos gave Smith a room in the house.

Smith worked on the Zuninos' farm and began studying the Italian language, which he realised he had to learn if he was to travel through enemy territory to the Allied lines. After a month, the local partisan commander, Antonio Bozzano (nicknamed "Barbetta" because of his beard), came to meet Smith, and asked him to join his ranks. When Barbetta asked his rank, Smith said he was a captain. "Oh well," Barbetta replied, tapping him on the shoulder; "you are now a major. I make you a major." Smith realised that Barbetta had given him this "promotion" in the hope of elevating his own reputation in the resistance movement—"none of the other regiments in the area could boast an Inglesi pilote and a majore to boot", he explained in his memoirs. Smith got on well with Barbetta, and took part in sabotage operations for about three months during late 1944. Meanwhile, he became proficient in Italian. After the Germans pulled out of their local garrison at Sassello in October 1944, Smith told Barbetta that he was going to attempt to return to the Allied lines. The partisans tried to talk him out of it, telling him it was too risky, but when Smith insisted, they gave him letters to take with him, endorsing him to other Italian partisan groups he might encounter on his way. A British Army corporal known to Smith as "Bill", who had been hiding in a nearby village, asked if he could come as well, and Smith agreed.

Smith headed west, across the Ligurian Alps, towards southern France, which he knew had just been invaded by Allied troops, principally Americans, Free French and British. He and Bill were assisted along the way by Italian partisan groups and other locals. After 10 days on the road, three other Allied personnel—a Frenchman, an Austrian and a Pole—joined the trek, having met Smith and Bill at a partisan camp. The lingua franca of the group having changed to Italian, the five men hiked to the border, where they were taken in by an old farmer, Jean Batiste Chambrin, who gave them instructions on how to pass the German sentries guarding the border with France. The soldiers decided that because it would be too risky to try to cross all together, Smith and Bill would go first, with the Frenchman, Austrian and Pole following the next day.

Chambrin did not speak English, but summoned his English-speaking brother. Smith produced his RAF rank insignia as proof of his identity. Smith and Bill made their way to the border crossing, guided by Chambrin, who told them that his brother would meet them on the other side of the border. The only crossing was a bridge, manned by German sentries. Smith observed the checkpoint for a while, and saw that pedestrians crossing alone or in pairs were rarely challenged, while larger groups often were. He thought it might be possible simply to walk across, and told Bill to "just look straight ahead and walk quietly on". They were not challenged, and met Chambrin's brother a few miles away. The Austrian and Frenchman joined them the next day; the Polish soldier, who had appeared to Smith to be underage, had lost his nerve on seeing the Germans and had gone back.

Having crossed into France, they sought friendly troops. They decided to bypass the German positions by crossing the Maritime Alps, with a local guide, over the course of two days. They lacked equipment and clothing for mountaineering. During the night, Smith took off his shoes, and found in the morning that they had frozen and that he could not put them on. He continued in his socks, which wore through, forcing him to finish the journey walking barefoot on the ice and snow. Twenty-three days after Smith and Bill set off from Piancastagna, they met American troops who took them to a local base camp, from where they were returned to their respective forces. The Americans took Smith to Marseille, from where he was flown to the RAF transit camp at Naples. On arriving in late November 1944, Smith sent a brief telegram home to Selukwe: "Alive and well. Love to you all—Ian."

Late war and demobilisation
It was well known to British servicemen that spending three months or more missing behind enemy lines resulted in an automatic posting back home, which Smith did not want; he was therefore wary as he entered his interview at the Naples transit base. When passage back to Rhodesia via Egypt was offered, Smith successfully requested permission to go to Britain instead, saying that he had many relatives there and considered it a second home. In England he was posted to a six-week refresher course in Shropshire, flying Spitfires. Smith performed very strongly in the exercises and, at his own request, was posted back to active service after only three weeks in the course. He was attached to No. 130 (Punjab) Squadron, part of No. 125 Wing, which was commanded by Group Captain (later Air Vice Marshal) Johnnie Johnson, one of the most successful RAF flying aces of the war. Reporting for duty with No. 130 Squadron at Celle, in western Germany, on 23 April 1945, he flew combat missions there, "[having] a little bit of fun shooting up odd things", he recalled, until the European war ended on 7 May with Germany's surrender.

Smith remained with No. 130 Squadron for the rest of his service, flying with it to Copenhagen, and then, via Britain, to Norway. He spent around five months in Norway as part of the post-war occupation forces, but did not learn Norwegian, later telling Berlyn that it seemed much harder to him than Italian, "and they all spoke English, you see". After No. 130 Squadron returned to Britain in November 1945, Smith was demobilised and sent home. He was met at RAF Kumalo in Bulawayo by his family, with whom he drove back to Selukwe. Journalist R. W. Johnson wrote that Smith's war service was "undoubtedly the central experience of his life".

War wounds

The plastic surgery used to reconstruct Smith's face following his crash in the Western Desert in 1943 left his face somewhat lopsided, with partial paralysis. In her 1978 biography of Smith, Berlyn writes that the grafted skin on his face "almost hides the injuries even today, though it has left him with a slightly blank expression". This was often commented on by observers, and when Smith died in 2007, it was prominent in many of his obituaries. "It was Ian Smith's war-damaged left eye that drew people's attention first," began the report printed in the London Times: "wide open, heavy-lidded and impassive from experimental plastic surgery, it hinted at a dull, characterless nature. The other was narrow, slanting and slightly hooded. Being watched by it was an uncomfortable experience. Each eye could have belonged to a different person." The Daily Telegraph took a similar line, reporting that the operation to reconstruct Smith's face had "left him with a somewhat menacing stare".

Smith's injuries also made him permanently unable to sit for long periods without pain, so when he attended conferences as a politician, he would briefly rise from his seat from time to time. During his talks with British Prime Minister Harold Wilson aboard HMS Tiger in 1966, Smith regularly got up and looked out of a porthole; the British incorrectly interpreted this as Smith feeling intimidated by Wilson, or seasick.

Influence on political career

Smith completed his studies at Rhodes during 1946, and entered politics in 1948 when he successfully contested the Selukwe seat on behalf of the Liberal Party, becoming his home town's representative in the Legislative Assembly at the age of 29. He rose through the political ranks with the United Federal Party during the 1950s, and in 1962 helped to form the Rhodesian Front, a right-wing party whose avowed goal was full independence from Britain without an immediate transfer to black majority rule. He became Deputy Prime Minister in December that year when the new party, led by Winston Field, surprised most observers by winning that month's election. After the Cabinet forced Field to resign in April 1964, following his failure to gain independence from Britain, they chose Smith as the new Prime Minister.

Smith, Southern Rhodesia's first native-born head of government, was strongly influenced as premier by his wartime experiences. Smith's memories of his service for Britain with the Royal Air Force caused him to feel betrayed when the British government proved one of his main adversaries as Prime Minister. After talks repeatedly broke down, Smith's government unilaterally declared independence on 11 November 1965. In 1970, following the results of a referendum, he declared Rhodesia a republic. He argued that Britain was to blame for the situation, saying, "Rhodesia did not want to seize independence from Britain. It was forced upon us."

Smith's own military service and reputation for bravery gave rise to positive sentiments regarding him personally while premier. White Rhodesians widely hailed him a war hero, as did many overseas commentators. Most reports in the British press about Smith referenced his war wounds or otherwise alluded to his past military service. In 1966, Smith's supporters in Britain sent him a painting depicting two Spitfires taking off for a dawn raid, "on behalf of many British people who remained true despite the misguidance of government". Smith retained his affection for the Spitfire; in his memoirs he described it as "the most beautiful aircraft ever made." He also retained some proficiency in the Italian language, though according to one Italian visitor his accent was "atrocious".

Smith's years as an RAF pilot were often alluded to in political rhetoric and popular culture. In the phrase of Martin Francis, "no white Rhodesian kitchen in the 1960s and 1970s was complete without an illustrated dishcloth featuring 'Good Old Smithy' and his trusty Spitfire". With regards to coverage of the Rhodesian Bush War historian Luise White wrote, "Smith's war service was invariably mentioned by foreign journalists but was of no real interest to national servicemen." The Rhodesian Front's election strategy of emphasising Smith's reputation as a war hero was criticised by the journalist Peter Niesewand, who was deported from Rhodesia in 1973; according to Niesewand, Smith's contribution to the Allied war effort had been "to crash two perfectly good Hurricane planes for the loss of no Germans". Smith won decisive election victories in 1970, 1974 and 1977, and remained in office until the country was reconstituted under majority rule as Zimbabwe Rhodesia in 1979. He continued to wear his RAF Spitfire pilot's tie well into old age, including on the final day before Zimbabwe Rhodesia's formal establishment on 1 June 1979—"a final gesture of defiance", Bill Schwarz writes, "symbolising an entire lost world."

References

Footnotes

Citations

Bibliography

Newspapers and magazines

 
 
 
 
 
 
 
 
 
 
 

Ian Smith
Smith, Ian
Smith, Ian
Smith, Ian
Smith, Ian